Paliouri is a village and a community in the peninsula of Kassandra, Chalkidiki, Greece. It is situated between low mountains near the southeasternmost tip of the peninsula, Cape Paliouri. The community includes the small villages Agios Nikolaos and Xyna. Paliouri is 2 km from the sea, 5 km east of Agia Paraskevi and 7 km southeast of Pefkochori.
Near the modern village is placed the ancient city Theramvos, which survived until Roman times as village dependent administratively from the Roman colony of Cassandreia.

Population

See also

List of settlements in Chalkidiki

References

External links

Paliouri Kassandra Halkidiki  
Paliouri on GTP Travel Pages (in English and Greek)

Populated places in Chalkidiki